Yordanos Abay (born 28 March 1984) is a retired Ethiopian international footballer.

Career

Club career
Abay has played club football in Ethiopia, the Netherlands, and Yemen for Dire Dawa Railway, EEPCO, Vitesse Arnhem, Ethiopian Coffee and Al-Saqr.

International career
Abay played at the 2001 FIFA World Youth Championship, and made his senior debut that same year. He has appeared in FIFA World Cup qualifying matches.

Honours
 Topscorer Yemen League 2003–04: 15 goals
Topscorer Yemen League 2004–05: 15 goals

References

External links
Yordanos Abay interview, 2011

1984 births
Living people
Sportspeople from Dire Dawa
Ethiopian footballers
Ethiopia international footballers
Ethiopian expatriate footballers
Association football forwards
Expatriate footballers in Yemen
Al-Saqr SC players
Yemeni League players
EEPCO F.C. players
Ethiopian Coffee S.C. players
Ethiopian Premier League players
Ethiopian expatriate sportspeople in Yemen